Teague Moriarty (born April 21, 1983) is an American chef best known for holding a Michelin star at his San Francisco restaurant called Sons & Daughters. He has since opened The Square and Sweet Woodruff, also in San Francisco.

Biography 
As a Northern California native with roots in Santa Cruz, Teague gained his experience from places around the Bay—his career includes baking at Emily's Bakery in Santa Cruz; Limón Rotisserie in San Francisco; B Restaurant & Bar in Oakland; and Gregoire in Berkeley. Teague, along with Matt McNamara—a friend he met at California Culinary Academy in 2004—developed and opened Sons & Daughters in 2010. In addition to their restaurant endeavors, Teague and Matt started Dark Hill Farm in 2013, a produce and livestock farm fully supporting the Sons & Daughters Restaurant Group as a means to manage, maintain, and increase quality. The farm is located in Santa Cruz and is a closed loop between the restaurant and the farm—not open to the public.

Accolades
Moriarty's accolades include recognition as a Rising Star Chef by the James Beard Foundation, a Rising Star Chef in 2012 by San Francisco Chronicle, Best Restaurant in SF by GQ Magazine, 30 Under 30 in SF by Zagat, and 30 under 30 in Food and Wine by Forbes Magazine.

References

External links
 Review published by San Francisco Chronicle.

1983 births
Living people
People from Santa Cruz, California
Head chefs of Michelin starred restaurants
American company founders
American chefs